Warszewo is a municipal neighbourhood of the city of Szczecin, Poland situated on the left bank of Oder river, north-west of the Szczecin Old Town and Middle Town. It is situated on the southern edge of Puszcza Wkrzańska on Warszewo Hills (Polish: Wzgórza Warszewskie) c.a. 110 m. As of January 2011 it had a population of 7,522.

Before 1945 when Stettin was a part of Germany, the German name of this suburb was Warsow.

Warszewo has its football club Wicher Warszewo which plays in the Futsal Amator League (Środowiskowa Liga Futsalu).

Warzewo was until 1998 site of a powerful mediumwave transmitter.

References

Warszewo